Ernst-Marcus Thomas (born 23 March 1973) is a German actor, TV host, radio DJ and writer. From 2011 until 2021, he hosted The Afternoon Show on WDR 4 in Germany. 
For the past 20 years, Thomas has been a host for many live programs in Germany and Switzerland, including the national entertainment show, ZDF Fernsehgarten, and the daily  cooking show, ARD Buffet, which aired on Germany's national TV channel, ARD.

Thomas studied drama and psychology at the University of Munich and graduated with a Master of Arts. He also followed an education as a newspaper editor at Augsburger Allgemeine Zeitung, a major German daily newspaper.

Through his company, Charismedia, Thomas coaches CEOs and top managers throughout Europe on public speaking. He's also a lecturer at the Zurich University of Applied Sciences and the ARD.ZDF Media-Academy.

In 2015, Thomas published the best-selling nonfiction book Der Perfekte Auftritt (The Perfect Performance) about the art of public speaking. In 2018/19, Thomas played a part in the action-comedy The Spy Who Dumped Me starring Mila Kunis and Kate McKinnon. The movie was partly filmed in Thomas' hometown of Amsterdam.

His book 'Relationship Tango. How we Subconsciously Sabotage Love' is a psychological essay, published in 2020.
In July 2020 Thomas published his first foray into fiction: 'The Dead Don't Play Piano' is an Amsterdam based detective story, for which Thomas used the alias 'Kees van Kikkerland'. Kikkerland ('land of the frogs') refers to the tongue-in-cheek synonym the Dutch are using for The Netherlands.

Credits TV 
 2018: The Spy Who Dumped Me, director: Susanna Fogel.
 2013: Schimanski, director: Kaspar Heidelbach.
 2012: Süskind, dubbing actor. director: Rudolf van den Berg.
 2012: Moderation "Ernst-Marcus Thomas - Der Talk" bei Sat.1.
 since 2011: Radio host at public German broadcasting company WDR4, WDR 4.
 2008: Wege zum Glück, director: Petra Wiemers
 2008: ZDF-Fernsehgarten, ZDF.
 2006 - 2009: EMT Talk, Star TV Switzerland.
 2003-2008: ARD-Buffet, ARD.
 2005-2007: Plietsch, NDR.
 2006: NDR Talkshow, NDR.
 2006: ARD-Advisor: Technics, ARD.
 2006: TV-Fans, NDR.
 2004-2006: Das!, NDR.
 2005: Harbour Stories, NDR.
 2002-2005: Olis Wild World, KI.KA.
 2001: Die Kommissarin, (episode: „Todeskuriere"), director: Charly Weller
 2000: Marienhof, 15 episodes, character: Dario, director: Dieter Schlotterbeck
 1998-2002: Philipp's Animal Hour, KI.KA/ARD.

Books 
 Theater in der Zirkuskuppel („Theater at the Circus dome“). Grin, München 2002. 
 Traumberuf Moderator ("Dream Job TV host"). Hinter den Kulissen der TV-Welt. Tectum, Marburg 2015. 
 Der perfekte Auftritt ("The Perfect Performance“). Haufe, Freiburg 2015. 3rd revised edition: 2019 
 Beziehungs-Tango ("Relationship Tango. How we subconsciously sabotage love“). Hogrefe, Bern (CH) 2020 
 Tote spielen kein Klavier ("The Dead Don't Play Piano“). Piper, Munich 2020

Sources 

Spiegel Online

External links

Book "Der perfekte Auftritt". Haufe publishing house (in German)
E.M. Thomas' literary agency in Hamburg
"Tote spielen kein Klavier". Piper publishing house (in German)

German journalists
German male journalists
German television presenters
1973 births
Living people
German male writers
ARD (broadcaster) people